The Gorakhpur - Nautanwa Express is an Express train belonging to North Eastern Railway zone that runs between Gorakhpur Junction and Nautanwa in India. It is currently being operated with 15019/15020 train numbers on six days in a week basis.

Service

The 15019/Gorakhpur - Nautanwa Express has an average speed of 31 km/hr and covers 82.4 km in 2h 40m. The 15020/Nautanwa - Gorakhpur Express has an average speed of 35 km/hr and covers 82.4 km in 2h 20m.

Route and halts 

The important halts of the train are:

Coach composite

The train has standard ICF rakes with a max speed of 110 kmph. The train consists of 12 coaches:

 10 General Unreserved
 2 Seating cum Luggage Rake

Traction

Both trains are hauled by a Gonda Loco Shed based WDM 3 or WDP-4D diesel locomotive from Gorakhpur to Nautanwa and vice versa.

Rake Sharing 

The train shares its rake with 15105/15106 Chhapra - Gorakhpur Intercity Express.

Notes

See also 

 Chhapra - Gorakhpur Intercity Express
 Gorakhpur Junction railway station
 Nautanwa railway station

References

External links 

 15019/Gorakhpur - Nautanwa Express
 15020/Nautanwa - Gorakhpur Express

Passenger trains originating from Gorakhpur
Transport in Nautanwa
Express trains in India